The 2018–19 Navy Midshipmen men's basketball team represented the United States Naval Academy during the 2018–19 NCAA Division I men's basketball season. The Midshipmen were led by eighth-year head coach Ed DeChellis, and played their home games at Alumni Hall in Annapolis, Maryland as members of the Patriot League. They finished the season 12–19 overall, 8–10 in Patriot League play to finish in a tie for fifth place. As the No. 5 seed in the Patriot League tournament, they advanced to the semifinals, where they were defeated by eventual tournament champion Colgate.

Previous season
The Midshipmen finished the 2017–18 season 20–12, 11–7 in Patriot League play to finish in a tie for third place. They lost in the quarterfinals of the Patriot League tournament to Holy Cross.

Offseason

Departures

2018 recruiting class 
There were no recruiting class for Navy for 2018.

2019 recruiting class

Roster

Schedule and results

|-
!colspan=9 style=| Non-conference regular season

|-
!colspan=9 style=| Patriot League regular season

|-
!colspan=9 style=| Patriot League tournament

Source

References

Navy Midshipmen men's basketball seasons
Navy
Navy
Navy